Conosimus baenai is a species of planthopper native to the Iberian Peninsula in Spain.  Its coloration ranges between light yellow and greenish-yellow.  Males measure about 4.1–4.4 millimeters in length while females measure about 4.7–5.0 millimeters.  The species was named after Manuel Baena, a hemipterologist.

References

Issidae
Insects described in 2014
Endemic fauna of Spain
Hemiptera of Europe